Year 1092 (MXCII) was a leap year starting on Thursday (link will display the full calendar) of the Julian calendar.

Events 
 By place 

 Byzantine Empire 
 Summer – Emperor Alexios I (Komnenos) bribes one of Kilij Arslan's (sultan of the Sultanate of Rum) officials to recover Sinope (the capital of Paphlagonia), and neighbouring coastal regions. He uses the Byzantine fleet to defeat the Seljuk navy off the coast of Cius in Bithynia.

 Europe 
 January 14 – Vratislaus II, the first king of Bohemia, dies after a 6½-year reign and is succeeded by his brother Conrad I who becomes duke and not king because Vratislaus has been elevated to the royal dignity 'for life' by Emperor Henry IV (see 1085). Conrad dies September 6 after a 8-month reign and is succeeded by his nephew Bretislav II (the eldest son of Vratislaus).

 England 
 Summer – King William II annexes Cumbria from the Scottish Celtic kingdom of Strathclyde, and builds Carlisle Castle.
 May 11 – Lincoln Cathedral, one of England's finest Gothic buildings, is consecrated.
 High tides cause great flooding in England and Scotland. The Kentish lands of Earl Godwin are inundated, becoming known as the Goodwin Sands.

 Seljuk Empire 
 November 19 – Sultan Malik-Shah I dies after a 20-year reign while hunting. The Seljuk Empire falls into chaos, his brother Tutush I and rival successors carve up their own independent sultanates in the Middle East. Malik-Shah is succeeded by his son Mahmud I, but he does not gain control of the empire.

 China 
 Su Song, a Chinese statesman and scientist, publishes his Xin Yi Xiang Fa Yao, a treatise outlining the construction and operation of his complex astronomical clocktower, built in Kaifeng. It also includes a celestial atlas of five star maps.

 By topic 

 Religion 
 April 21 – The Diocese of Pisa is elevated to the dignity of a metropolitan archdiocese by Pope Urban II.
 May 21 – Synod of Szabolcs: King Ladislaus I assembles a council of the prelates of Hungary at the fortress of Szabolcs.

Births 
 Adélaide de Maurienne, queen of France (d. 1154)
 Al-Mustarshid, caliph of the Abbasid Caliphate (d. 1135)
 Fulk V (the Younger), king of Jerusalem (d. 1143)
 Magnús Einarsson, bishop of Skálholt (d. 1148)
 Peter the Venerable, French monk and abbot (d. 1156) 
 Sachen Kunga Nyingpo, Tibetan Buddhist leader (d. 1158)
 Sybilla of Normandy, queen of Scotland (d. 1122)
 Zhang Jiucheng, Chinese politician (d. 1159)

Deaths 
 January 14 – Vratislaus II, duke and king of Bohemia
 May 7 – Remigius de Fécamp, bishop of Lincoln
 September 6 – Conrad I, duke of Bohemia
 October 14 – Nizam al-Mulk, Seljuk vizier (b. 1018)
 November 19 – Malik-Shah I, Seljuk sultan (b. 1055)
 Abu'l-Qasim, Seljuk general and governor
 Bermudo Ovéquiz (or Vermudo), Spanish nobleman 
 Bogumił, archbishop of Gniezno (approximate date)
 Ermengol IV (or Armengol), count of Urgell (b. 1056)
 Helibo, Chinese nobleman and chieftain (b. 1039)
 Jordan of Hauteville, Italo-Norman nobleman
 Richard de Montfort, French nobleman

References